The 2003–04 Notre Dame Fighting Irish Men's Basketball Team represented the University of Notre Dame in the 2003–04 NCAA Division I men's basketball season.

Schedule

|-
!colspan=12 style=| Big East Tournament

|-
!colspan=9 style= | NIT

References 

Notre Dame Fighting Irish men's basketball seasons
Notre Dame
Notre Dame Fighting Irish
Notre Dame Fighting Irish
Notre Dame